is a village located in Kunigami District, Okinawa Prefecture, Japan.

As of October 2016, the village has an estimated population of 3,024 and a population density of 51 persons per km².

Several censuses have established that this village has the highest longevity index in the world with a large percentage of the population being over 100 years old.

Geography
Ōgimi is located at the north of Okinawa Island and faces the East China Sea on the western coast of the island. The village consists of forested flatland, which covers 78% of the area of the Ōgimi, and sharp, craggy cliffs which face the coast. The central coastal area of Ōgimi is bisected by Shioya Bay. Miyagi Island spans much of the entrance of the bay, and the island is connected to the mainland by the Shioya Ōhashi Bridge.

Culture 
The village is a centre of production of Ryukyuan pottery.

The Shioya Ungami Sea Festival is held at Shioya Bay and other areas of Ōgimi in July. Observance of the festival dates back 400 to 500 years to the period of the Ryukyuan Kingdom, and begins with prayers at an asagi, or house of worship, by kaminchu, or priestesses of the Okinawan religion. The religious ceremonies are followed by dragon boat races. The Unjami Festival was designated an Important Intangible Folk Cultural Properties of Japan in 1997.

Education
The village operates its public primary and junior high schools.
 Ogimi Junior High (大宜味中学校)
 Ogimi Elementary (大宜味小学校)
 It formed in 2016 as a merger of four elementary schools.

The Okinawa Prefectural Board of Education operates .

See also
 Yanbaru

References

External links

 Ōgimi official website 

Villages in Okinawa Prefecture